Smashing Barriers is a lost 1919 15-part 1919 American film serial directed by and starring William Duncan. It was produced and distributed by the Vitagraph Company of America.

This serial was condensed down to a 6-reel feature and rereleased by Vitagraph in 1923 under the same title.

Cast
William Duncan as Dan Stevens
Edith Johnson as Helen Cole
Walter Rodgers as Slicker Williams
George Stanley as John Stevens
Fred Darnton as Benjamin Cole
Slim Cole as Long Tom Brown
William McCall as Henry Marlin
Joe Ryan as Wirenail Hedges
Vincente Howard
Dorothea Wolbert

Chapters
The Test of Courage
The Plunge of Death
The Tree Hut of Torture
The Deed of a Devil
The Living Grave
Downward to Doom
The Fatal Plight
The Murder Car
The Dynamite Tree
Overpowered
The Den of Deviltry
Explosive Bullets
The Deadfall
Trapped Like Rats
The Human Chain (alternate title: "The Final Barrier")

Preservation status
The complete original chapter serial is lost. An incomplete abridgement of the 1923 feature version survives with a private collector.

References

External links

 
Lobby poster, color
Better resolution version of poster

1919 films
Vitagraph Studios film serials
Lost American films
American silent serial films
American black-and-white films
American adventure films
1919 adventure films
1919 lost films
Lost adventure films
Films directed by William Duncan
1910s American films
Silent adventure films